Restrepo is a village located in the parish of Paramios in Vegadeo, a municipality within the province and autonomous community of Asturias, in northern Spain.

References

Populated places in Asturias